Blind is a 2019 horror film that was directed by Marcel Walz, based on a script by Joe Knetter.

Synopsis
Faye is a successful actress whose career seems to only be on the rise. After receiving Lasik surgery Faye is left blinded and despondent, as her career seems to have dried up and she feels like she is unable to put her life back together. Her mood is given a boost by her friends Sophia and Luke, the latter of whom is mute and has unrequited feelings for Faye, which he feels can never be reciprocated. Things take a turn for the deadly when a creepy masked stranger begins to stalk Faye and murder the people around her.

Cast
 Sarah French as Faye Dayne
 Caroline Williams as Sophia Lewis
 Tyler Gallant as Luke
 Jed Rowen as Pretty Boy
 Thomas Haley as Officer Jacobs
 Ben Kaplan as Sushi Boy
 Jessica Galetti as Lydia

Production
Filming for Blind took place "almost a year before COVID". While filming Blind Walz deliberately added colors and styles reminiscent of the giallo genre, as he wanted it to be "more of a horror/drama" than a "straight horror movie".

Actor Tyler Gallant was brought on to portray Luke, a mute trainer, and to prepare for the role he viewed documentaries, videos, and books that covered mute people and muteness.

Release
Blind held a screening on July 10, 2019, in Beverly Hills, California for press and offered a limited amount of seating for general audience members. This was followed by an October 13, 2019 screening at the Festival of Fear and a digital screening the following year at FrightFest.

Blind was released to home video and VOD in the United States and United Kingdom on November 6, 2020.

Sequel 
In November 2020 Walz announced that there would be a sequel to Blind and that filming had been completed. He further stated that it would be a direct sequel, akin to the setup of Halloween and Halloween II, and would be called Pretty Boy.

Reception
Horror website Dread Central and sci-fi magazine Starburst both rated the film favorably, with the latter remarking that the "creeping pace and that divisive, frustrating ending will piss a lot of people off, but this is easily, queasily, one of the most disturbing horror films this year."

JumpCut and Flickering Myth were more negative, both criticizing the script's dialogue and pacing.

References

External links
 

2019 horror thriller films
2010s horror drama films
Films about blind people
2010s English-language films